Martin Dzúr (12 July 1919 – 15 January 1985) was a Slovak military officer and a communist politician, who served as defense minister from 1968 to 1985.

Early life and education
Dzúr was born in Ploštín (now part of Liptovský Mikuláš), Slovakia, on 12 July 1919. His parents were peasants. From 1937 to 1939 he studied woodworking. In the late 1940s he graduated from a military school, a higher academic course and the General Staff Academy in Moscow. He also received a degree in engineering.

Career and activities
Dzúr joined the Slovak army for military draft service in 1941. However, he left the Slovak army and defected to the Soviet Union in January 1943. He joined both the Soviet forces and the illegal Czechoslovak Communist Party in 1943. Then he began to serve in the 119th brigade of the Red Army. Following World War II he became a captain in the Soviet-assisted Czechoslovak independent brigade in 1946. 

In 1959, Dzúr was made deputy defense minister. He was appointed defense minister under President Ludvík Svoboda in April 1968, replacing Bohumír Lomský in the post. He was a colonel general when he was named as the minister of defense. Four months after Dzúr's appointment the Soviet Union invaded Czechoslovakia in August 1968.

In the immediate aftermath of the invasion, Dzúr was arrested in his office by two Soviet military officers. Ivan Yershov, Soviet chief of staff during the invasion, stated in 1989 that Dzúr initially refused to take orders from the Soviets, arguing that only Alexander Dubček, leader of the Czechoslovak communist party, could give orders to him. However, Andrei Grechko, the former commander of the Warsaw Pact, told Dzúr by telephone that "if a single Czechoslovak soldier fired so much as one shot, he would personally hang Dzúr from the first tree." Dzúr was allowed only to call Dubček to inform him of the invasion. On 28 September 1968 Dzúr increased the number of Czech military areas accessible to Soviet troops. 

Dzúr was elected to the communist party's central committee in 1971. His term as defense minister ended on 11 January 1985 when he retired from office due to ill health. Milán Václavík replaced him in the post.

Views
Dzúr was close to Alexander Dubček. The 1970 CIA report describes Dzúr as a moderate like Dubček.

Honours and awards
Dzúr was awarded the highest Soviet prize, the Order of Lenin, in 1983.

Death
Only four days after his removal from office Dzúr died of "a long and serious illness" in Prague on 15 January 1985.

References

External links

1919 births
1985 deaths
Czechoslovak generals
Czechoslovak military personnel of World War II
Defectors to the Soviet Union
Government ministers of Czechoslovakia
Members of the Central Committee of the Communist Party of Czechoslovakia
Members of the Chamber of the People of Czechoslovakia (1971–1976)
Members of the Chamber of the People of Czechoslovakia (1976–1981)
Members of the Chamber of the People of Czechoslovakia (1981–1986)
Military Academy of the General Staff of the Armed Forces of the Soviet Union alumni
People of the Cold War
People from Liptovský Mikuláš District
Recipients of the Order of Lenin
Recipients of the Cross of Valour (Poland)
Recipients of the Scharnhorst Order
Recipients of the Order of the Red Banner
Slovak military personnel of World War II
Slovak engineers
20th-century engineers